Memento is the first studio album by Berlin-based electronic band Booka Shade, released on 4 November 2004 on Get Physical Music.

Track listing

References

2004 debut albums
Booka Shade albums